The Iapydes (or Iapodes, Japodes) were an ancient people who dwelt north of and inland from the Liburnians, off the Adriatic coast and eastwards of the Istrian peninsula. They occupied the interior of the country between the Colapis (Kupa) and Oeneus (Una) rivers, and the Velebit mountain range (Mons Baebius) which separated them from the coastal Liburnians. Their territory covered the central inlands of modern Croatia and Una River Valley in today's Bosnia and Herzegovina. Archaeological documentation confirms their presence in these countries at least from 9th century BC, and they persisted in their area longer than a millennium. The ancient written documentation on inland Iapydes is scarcer than on the adjacent coastal peoples (Liburni, Delmatae, etc.) that had more frequent maritime contacts with ancient Greeks and Romans.

The Iapydes had their maximal development and territorial expansion from the 8th to 4th centuries BC. They settled mostly in inland mountain valleys between Pannonia and the coastal Adriatic basin, but in disputation with southern Liburni they periodically reached also the northern Adriatic coast at Vinodol valley (classical Valdevinum).

Their culture is largely nebulous due to the lack of material evidence. The Iapydes are believed to have been an Illyrian subgroup or mixed nation of Celts and Pannonian Illyrians with a strong Venetic element.

A major scholar of the Japodi was archaeologist Branka Raunig.

Origin and affinity

The exact origin of early Iapydes is uncertain; archaeological documentation suggests mixed affinities to early Pannonii and Illyrians. The first written mention of an Illyrian tribe is from Greek writers from the 6th century BC. They are provisionally described by Strabo as a mixed race of Celts and Illyrians, who used Celtic weapons, tattooed themselves, and lived chiefly on spelt and millet; however, Strabo's suggestion of a mixed Celtic-Illyrian Iapydes culture is not confirmed by archaeology. Originally, Iapydes existed at least from the 9th century BC, and Celtic influence reached the region in the 4th century BC when Iapydes entered a decline. Archeological evidence of typical Celtic culture is documented only in the marginal contact zone of the Iapydes and the Celtic Taurisci along the Kupa river valley (now the Slovenian-Croatian border). Elsewhere, and especially in the main Iapydic area of the Lika highlands in Croatia, definite Celtic artifacts are scarce and explicable merely by commercial exchanges.

Roman conquest
Romans said of the Iapydes that they were a warlike race addicted to plundering expeditions, but other archaeological documentation confirms their main economical activity was mining and metallurgy. That attracted the pragmatic  Romans to conquer their country, whose river valleys were also a natural way for  strategic communications between the Adriatic and Pannonia. Therefore, induced conflicts started from 171 BC, when consul Gaius Cassius Longinus first attacked Iapydes. In 129 BC, Gaius Sempronius Tuditanus attacked the Iapydes and was nearly defeated, but Decimus Iunius Brutus arrived and rescued him, and he celebrated a triumph. Lucius Aurelius Cotta and Gaius Caecilius Metellus undertook another expedition against the Iapydes in 119, which concluded with a triumph in 117. In 78–76 BC they were also attacked by Gaius Cosconius as part of a war against the Dalmatians. They had a foedus from 56 BC with Rome and paid a tributum, but then from 52–47 BC rebelled. In 34 BC they were finally conquered by Augustus Caesar. Then they conserved a partial autonomy with a domestic praepositus Iapodum.

Culture and society
Due to the rich and extensive forests of their mountainous country, their houses were mostly wooden huts, and they rarely used stone constructions except in some major fortifications. Their settlements were mostly on hilltops, including between 400–3,000 dwellers, and the main Iapodic settlements in Roman times were Metulum, Terpon, Arupium and Avendo.

They cultivated chiefly cereals and grapes, and kept varied cattle. Their early metallurgy developed a half millennium before Celtic influence that induced here minor modifications. Their society was simple including warriors, villagers, herdsmen, miners, and metalworkers. In that early phase neither leaders nor elite were indicated, and these independent Iapydes had no detectable collective political organisation. Under the Romans, a Romanized elite emerged, led by the praepositus Iapodum installed by Romans.

Their classical culture was a varied mixture of Pannonian, Illyrian, Greek and Roman influences, mostly without proper peculiarities. Their figural art included the frequent metal decorations in the form of triangles and spirals, and large amber pearls and amber figurines. The Iapydic language before the Romans is mostly unknown: the only indications available are their toponyms and necropolis inscriptions from Roman times. These scarce onomastic indications suggest the Iapydic tongue may be correlated with other Illyrian and Pannonian tribes. During their independence, the Iapydes appear to have been completely illiterate and left no inscriptions before the Roman conquest.

Religion
The original religion of Iapydes is scarcely known, and it appears to be similar with other eastward Illyrians. They knew the divine pair of water-deities Vidassus (as Roman Sylvanus) and Thana (as Roman Diana), whose rocky reliefs persist today at some springs in their area. They worshiped the holy horse as their tribal totem, and also the holy snakes as the symbol of their ancestors. Their early tombs were usually in caves, and then in Roman times often in wooden sarcophagi and also incinerated in ceramic urns.

Japodian burial urns were art a unique form influenced to a degree by the Situla art of northern Illyria and Italy and by Greek art.

Archaeogenetics
A archaeogenetic studies published in Nature  (2022) examined 8 samples from three Early Iron Age Iapydes sites. All five tested men belonged to the Y-DNA haplogroup patrilineal line J2b2a1-L283 (> J-Y86930). The mtDNA haplogroups fell under H, H1, 2x H3b, H5, T2a1a, T2b and U5a1g.

See also

 Lika

References

Sources
Mitja Gustin et al.: Keltoi in Yugoslavia (Die Kelten und ihre Zeitgenossen auf dem Gebiet Jugoslawiens). Narodni muzej, Ljubljana 1984.
Radoslav Katicic: Zur Frage der keltischen und pannonischen Namengebiete im römischen Dalmatien. Godisnjak (Annuaire) 3, 55 p., Centar za balkanoloske studije, Sarajevo 1965.

Historical Celtic peoples
Gauls
Illyrian tribes
Celtic tribes of Illyria
Ancient tribes in Croatia
Ancient history of Slovenia
Ancient tribes in Bosnia and Herzegovina
Foederati
Illyrian Bosnia and Herzegovina